Omalium rugatum is a species of rove beetles native to Europe.

References

Staphylinidae
Beetles described in 1880
Beetles of Europe